Križnar is a Slovene surname. Notable people with the surname include:

 Nika Križnar (born 2000), Slovene ski jumper
 Tomo Križnar (born 1954), Slovene peace activist

See also
 

Slovene-language surnames